The nursing diagnosis readiness for enhanced spiritual well-being is defined as an "ability to experience and integrate meaning and purpose in life through a person's connectedness with self, others, art, music, literature, nature, or a power greater than oneself." (Anonymous, 2002, p. 68) and was approved by NANDA in 2002.

Defining characteristics
A person with this diagnosis may:

 Having an enhanced desire for hope;
 Feel that there is meaning and purpose to their life; 
 Have a sense of peace or serenity;
 Surrender love;
 Be forgiving towards themself, and request forgiveness of others; 
 Have a satisfying philosophy of life; 
 Experience joy, courage, or heightened coping;
 Pray or meditate;
 Connect with others; 
 Provide service to others; 
 Experience connections with nature;
 Experience connections with or a desire to create art, music, or literature, particularly of a religious or spiritual nature;
 Experience a connection with a power greater than oneself;
 Report mystical experiences;
 Participate in religious activities.

Sources

 Anonymous (2002). Diagnosis Review Committee: New and revised diagnoses. Nursing Diagnosis 13(2) p. 68-71. Philadelphia:NANDA

Nursing diagnoses
Spirituality